Osmondagi bolalar is a 2002 Uzbek comedy film. The film has had success and has received acclaim as one of the best modern Uzbek films.

A sequel, Osmondagi bolalar 2, was released in Uzbekistan in 2003.

References

External links

Ostern films
Uzbekistani comedy films
2002 films
Films set in Uzbekistan
2002 comedy films
Uzbek-language films